The Manly Life Saving Club is one of Australia's oldest Surf Life Saving Clubs, founded in 1911; located in the Sydney suburb of , in the Northern Beaches Council in New South Wales.

History
The club was founded in 1911 to patrol Manly Beach after a law banning daylight swimming was overturned.
In 1912 Captain Arthur Holmes, known as "Skipper" was appointed president of the Manly Life-Saving Club, a position which he held with conspicuous ability for 26 years. During his long term the club rose under his able administration, built up into one of the finest surfing organisations in the State. As a carnival organiser he stood alone, his principal achievement in this direction being the great surfing gala at South Steyne on the occasion of the visit of the Duke of Gloucester. He was organiser and manager of the first surf life-saving team to visit Western Australia. His services were rewarded by being appointed one of the first life-members of the SLSA. He was similarly honoured by the old club, to whose members he had been for years a guide, philosopher and friend. For many years he was also one of the stalwarts of the Manly Amateur Swimming Club. A high proportion of the Surf Life Saving members were soldiers. Skipper had served in the Boer War and during the Great War of 1914-18, Captain Arthur Holmes threw himself enthusiastically into all patriotic efforts. Captain Arthur Holmes was the younger brother of Major General William Holmes (the most senior Australian officer to die in battle in WW1). He was secretary for years of the Voluntary Workers' Association, formed in 1916, to provide homes for disabled soldiers and sailors and their dependants. Arthur Holmes was born in Victoria Barracks, in 1867, one of 12 children, and died in 1943. His grandson, Bruce T M Holmes recalled many fond memories of swimming at Manly as a child. He also said that Bondi had the first Surf Life Saving club in Sydney. There are some lovely old photos in the Club rooms. Cited Louise M Holmes, Skipper's great grand daughter July 2019

 The founding President of the club was James Bonner, also then Mayor of Manly. The current club President is actor Tony Bonner, grandson of James Bonner.

Manly, Bondi Surf Bathers' Life Saving Club and Bronte Surf Lifesaving Club all have competing claims to be the first in Australia (and the world).

Location on South Steyne, the Club operated the Manly Surf Life Saving Pavilion that was designed by Winsome Hall Andrew and completed in 1939; when it was awarded the 1939 Sulman Award for Architecture. The pavilion was demolished in 1990.

Life Saving
The primary role of the club is to provide surf rescue, first aid and promote water safety on Manly Beach. Since 1911, no lives have been lost on the beach while the club has been on patrol.

Competition
The club also participates in beach, surf, and ocean competitive sporting activities.

Surf Carnivals are held during the summer patrol season, from October until April, at numerous beach locations;

• Locally ( most common )

• Branch (clubs within a local geographical area)

• Inter - Branch

• State Titles

• Inter - State

• National Titles (commonly known within the SLSA movement as "AUSSIES")

• Internationally 

Members are able to compete in a number of disciplines, under the guise of SLSA- Surf Sports;

• Beach Sprint (90m)

• Beach Run (2km)

• Flags

• Ironman / Ironwoman

• Rescue Board Paddling

• Surf Ski Paddling

• Surf Race

• Taplin Relay

• Surf Boat Rowing

• Rescue and Resuscitation (R&R)

• Lifesaving Patrol

• First Aid 

• IRB Racing

See also

Surf lifesaving
Surf Life Saving Australia
List of Australian surf lifesaving clubs

References

External links

Surf Life Saving Australia clubs
Sporting clubs in Sydney
Manly, New South Wales
1903 establishments in Australia
Sports clubs established in 1903